The Meteor Rideau is a full-size automobile that was produced by Canadian manufacturer Meteor from 1954 until 1961 and from 1965 until 1976. It was named for the Rideau River, a river in Eastern Ontario, the province where the car was built. From 1957, the line included both the Rideau series and the higher-trim Rideau 500. The Rideau began as the top-trim level of the Meteor line, but beginning with the 1956 models, it was the lowest trim series.

References

External links
"Hemmings Find of the Day – 1957 Meteor Rideau 500 Victoria," by Daniel Strohl (Sep 7, 2014)
Unearthed: 1954 Mercury Meteor Rideau Skyliner (CarBuzz.com)

Cars introduced in 1954
1960s cars
1970s cars
Rideau
Sedans
Coupés